Irina Podoinikova (born 28 June 1988) is a Kazakhstani canoeist. She competed in the women's K-2 500 metres event at the 2016 Summer Olympics.

References

External links
 

1988 births
Living people
Kazakhstani female canoeists
Olympic canoeists of Kazakhstan
Canoeists at the 2016 Summer Olympics
Place of birth missing (living people)
Asian Games gold medalists for Kazakhstan
Asian Games silver medalists for Kazakhstan
Asian Games bronze medalists for Kazakhstan
Asian Games medalists in canoeing
Canoeists at the 2010 Asian Games
Canoeists at the 2014 Asian Games
Canoeists at the 2018 Asian Games
Medalists at the 2010 Asian Games
Medalists at the 2014 Asian Games
Medalists at the 2018 Asian Games
21st-century Kazakhstani women